Boroituli is an Indian village in Lawngtlai district and Mizoram State. The population is approximately 400 people, and is ethnically composed of both Chakma and Tongchangya peoples. It is situated near the River Thega and as per the map of Chakma Autonomous District Council (CADC) the River Thega lies to the west (which borders on Bangladesh), New Jagnasury to east, Jaruldubosora to the north, and New Chippui to its south. It is in the eastern region of the CADC. Agriculture and the cultivation of Jhum are the main sources of subsistence. Boroituli contains a co-educational primary and  middle  school, which as of 2016 catered for a student body of boys and girls, with a staff.

Etymology  
The term Boroituli is a combination of two words Boroi which means a type of fruit and Tuli which means a residential place. In another sense Tuli means Head of a roof.

Politics
The village is headed by Village Executive committee consisting Village Council President (VCP)],5 Members and Dakkhirani.
The village falls under 17 Jaruldubasora constituency which comprises 5 villages councils(Jaruldubasora, Boroituli, Ludisora, Gerasury and New-Jagnasury-2). 
The present MDC in 17 Jaruldubasora constituency is Lakkhan Chakma.

Festival
The Villagers celebrate various festival like Bizu, Alpaloni and religious festival like Buddha Purnima , Madhu Pornima etc.

Games and Sport
The Youths of Boroituli play various traditional games like Giley Hara, Nadeng Hara, Potti Hara etc.
They also play football and volleyball. There is a large playground in the periphery of Boroituli for playing football.

Recent history
In August 2016, it was assessed as being owed compensation (with '234 victims') for the Indo-Bangla fence.

References

Villages in Chakma Autonomous District Council